Piple, Tehrathum is a market center in Myanglung Municipality in the Himalayas of Terhathum District, Kosi Zone of eastern Nepal. Formerly known as the Village Development Committee, it merged into the municipality on May 18, 2014.

Demographics 
At the time of the 1991 Nepal census, it had a population of 1,613 people residing in 285 individual households. Piple is one of the Village Development Committees located in Myamglumg.

Geography

Villages bordering Piple include Bhandara, Korak, Manahari, and Kankada. Parsa National Park, home to critically endangered and threatened species including tigers and gaur, also borders Piple.

References

External links
UN map of the municipalities of Terhathum District

Populated places in Tehrathum District